Laura Elizabeth Innes (born August 16, 1957) is an American actress and television director.  She starred as Dr. Kerry Weaver in the NBC medical drama ER from 1995 to 2007 and reprised her role from 2008 to 2009 in the final season. She also starred as Sophia in the short-lived NBC thriller The Event from 2010 to 2011.

Career

Innes was introduced to professional theater by her father, who frequently took the family to the Stratford Festival of Canada in Stratford, Ontario. Following his advice to "do what you love," she attended Northwestern University graduating in 1980, where she was a member of the Alpha Chi Omega sorority and earned a degree in theater.

Her first stage credits were in Chicago at the renowned Goodman Theatre and Wisdom Bridge Theatre, where she played Stella in A Streetcar Named Desire. John Malkovich played Mitch in this production. Other major stage credits include Two Shakespearean Actors with Eric Stoltz at Lincoln Center, Our Town at the Seattle Repertory Theatre, and Three Sisters at the La Jolla Playhouse in San Diego.

In 1986, Innes co-starred as Krissy Bender Marino, the daughter of Jerry Stiller and Anne Meara in the short-lived sitcom The Stiller and Meara Show. In 1989, Innes played Miss Andrews in the Nickelodeon sitcom Hey Dude in the second season episode "Teacher's Pest". She also played Mrs. Fleeman in the episode "Baby". In the 1990s, Innes guest-starred in television series including Party of Five, My So-Called Life and Brooklyn Bridge and appeared in the Emmy-winning TV movie And the Band Played On before being cast in her first major television role in the NBC sitcom Wings from 1991 to 1993. She played Bunny, the promiscuous ex-wife of Lowell Mather (Thomas Haden Church).

In the fall of 1995, Innes began a recurring role in the second season of the hit NBC medical drama ER, where she was cast as Dr. Kerry Weaver, the skilled chief of the ER with an abrasive exterior and a physical disability. She was added to the main cast in the third season. In 2001, her character came out as gay during the seventh season. She received two Emmy Award nominations for her role, and three Screen Actors Guild Awards with the ER ensemble cast, and has received five nominations for Best Supporting Actress from Viewers For Quality Television. Innes also directed a number of episodes of the series, and episodes of Brothers & Sisters, Studio 60 on the Sunset Strip, House and The West Wing, one of which earned her an Emmy nomination for directing.

In January 2007, Innes left ER in the middle of the thirteenth season, becoming the longest-serving cast member in the show's history, but Noah Wyle appeared in four more episodes than her. From 2008 to 2009, Innes returned to ER during its 15th and final season for two episodes including the series finale "And in the End...". Innes' films include the blockbuster science fiction disaster film Deep Impact (1998) and the comedy Can't Stop Dancing (1999) with her former ER co-star Noah Wyle.

On May 7, 2010, NBC announced that Innes would be co-starring in the short-lived science fiction/mystery/action/thriller drama The Event as Sophia, "the leader of a mysterious group of detainees" with Lisa Vidal, who played Kerry Weaver's wife, Sandy Lopez, in the eighth, ninth and tenth seasons of ER. In 2012, she co-starred as Police Captain Tricia Harper in the short-lived NBC fantasy police procedural drama Awake.

Personal life
Innes was born and raised in Pontiac, Michigan, the youngest daughter of six children to Laurette and Robert Innes, a tool and die company executive. Her first fiancé, actor David Bell, was murdered in December 1980. A few years after the murder, she married actor David Brisbin and, in 1990, gave birth to their son, Cal. They later adopted a daughter, Mia, from China.

In 2006, Innes told the Daily Mirror that ten years of portraying Dr. Weaver's limp had caused her to experience the early stages of actual spinal damage ("the bottom of my spine is starting to curve on one side from 10 years of raising my hip"), and that as a consequence, ERs producers introduced a plot arc in which Weaver's symptoms were surgically relieved.

Charity work
Innes is an advocate for the disabled community, utilizing her role as a director to help employ disabled people. She is a supporter of the Performers with Disabilities Committee, which is associated with the Screen Actors Guild.

Filmography

Film

Television

References

External links 

 
 
 

1957 births
20th-century American actresses
21st-century American actresses
Actresses from Michigan
American film actresses
American television actresses
American television directors
American women television directors
Living people
Northwestern University School of Communication alumni
People from Pontiac, Michigan